David Atlanta magazine was an Atlanta-based weekly periodical for the gay community. It was owned by gay press publisher Window Media until Window Media closed operations, and ceased publication on November 16, 2009.

On March 11, 2010, David Atlanta returned to publishing weekly issues after being purchased from the bankruptcy court by Gaydar Atlanta. In August 2010, David Atlanta was sold along with Southern Voice to DRT Media. The August 11, 2011 issue was the first under new ownership.

History
Founded in October 1998, David was brought to Atlanta by Andy Jones to serve as an entertainment and lifestyle magazine for the Southeastern United States.  It was the successor to a line of gay magazines dating back to 1968, beginning in Jacksonville, Florida, founded by Henry C. Godley and Mark W. Riley. The magazine was named after the Michaelangelo statue.

In 2003 the publication was bought by United Media, publisher of the Southern Voice in Atlanta, and the Washington Blade in Washington, D.C.  David was merged into Window Media in 2005.

In November 2009, the magazine and its sister newspaper were shut down because of the financial status of its parent company, Window Media and its majority stockholder, Avalon Equity Fund.

References

External links
Official website

1998 establishments in Georgia (U.S. state)
2009 disestablishments in Georgia (U.S. state)
Defunct magazines published in the United States
LGBT culture in Atlanta
LGBT-related magazines published in the United States
Magazines established in 1998
Magazines disestablished in 2009
Magazines published in Atlanta
Weekly magazines published in the United States